Dense granules (also known as dense bodies or delta granules) are specialized secretory organelles. Dense granules are found only in platelets and are smaller than alpha granules. The origin of these dense granules is still unknown, however, it is thought that may come from the mechanism involving the endocytotic pathway. Dense granules are a sub group of lysosome-related organelles (LRO). There are about three to eight of these in a normal human platelet.

In unicellular organisms
They are found in animals and in unicellular organisms including Apicomplexa protozoans.

They are also found in Entamoeba.

Dense granules play a major role in Toxoplasma gondii. When the parasite invades it releases its dense granules which help to create the parasitophorous vacuole.

In multicellular organisms

Components
The dense granules of human platelets contain adenosine diphosphate (ADP), adenosine triphosphate (ATP), ionized calcium (which is necessary for several steps of the coagulation cascade), and serotonin. Dense granules are similar to lysosomes with an acidic pH and even some lysosomal proteins like CD63. There is a granular adenine nucleotide pool within the dense granule. It is thought that it is made up of system of insoluble calcium. This pool is likely to be different than that of the cytoplasmic nucleotides. In some animals it has been shown that the platelets contain histamine. During exocytosis, the pool of ATP within the dense granule is released. Serotonin is picked up by the dense granules where it interacts with ATP and calcium. The serotonin that is then released by the dense granule, recruits other platelets and helps play a major role in stopping the loss of blood at the injury. The calcium from a dense granule accounts for the majority of the calcium within the platelets and plays a role in the binding of different proteins.

Clinical significance
A deficiency of CD63 can be associated with Hermansky–Pudlak syndrome. The patients with this disease show signs of abnormal dense granules and melanosomes which can cause prolonged bleeding and albinism. Chediak-Higashi syndrome is an autosomal recessive disorder where patients platelets have a deficient amount of dense granules. CHS is very similar to beige mouse.

Biogenesis 
The dense granule is very important in the coagulation cascade because of the bleeding disorders caused by a dense granule deficiency. However, the exact details of how it created is unknown. It has been observed that they are produced in bone marrow by megakaryocytes. Within the megakaryocytes it is thought that their production has something to do with the endocytotic pathway. Dense granules have their components sent to maturing dense granules using vesicular nucleotide transporters. This is what is thought to cause the build up of ADP/ATP in dense granules. This mechanism is also responsible for the build up of MRP4 which picks up cAMP for the dense granule. Mice with MRP4-/- will have dysfunctional platelets from cAMP not being takin up from the cytosol and placed into the dense granule.

Membrane 
There are a number of proteins that are within the dense granule membrane. To maintain the low pH within the granule, there is a Hydrogen ion pumping ATPase. Ral has been found within the granule's membrane. There are several adhesive receptors that have luminal binding domains and are expressed post exocytosis. These adhesive receptors help the adhesive receptors on the surface of the platelets. One of these receptors is GPIb. GPIb is one of the more important receptors within platelets.

Function 
The true function of a dense granule is still unknown. However, the secretion of dense granules occurs along with platelet activation. Both, ADP and collagen can cause the secretion of dense granules. Patients and mice with dense granule deficiency have a harder time forming a hemostatic plug and therefore have a longer bleed time.

Detection 
The dense granules' matrix is dense with electrons that allow them to be detected through whole mount electron microscopy. The calcium levels within the dense granule allows for no extra staining when viewing the dense granule with an electron microscope. When observed by using transmission electron microscopy (TEM), these granules are osmophilic. The secretion of dense granules can be detected by seeing how much ATP/ADP is being released with luciferase-based luminescence. The relationship to ATP/ADP released can be used to then determine the secretion of dense granules. Another option is to observe the amount of serotonin being released from a platelet with a large amount of serotonin already on it. Another way to detect the secretion of dense granules is through flow cytometry. Since dense granules have surface membrane proteins, the activation of CD63 and LAMP-2 can be observed with flow cytometry.

See also
 Platelet alpha-granule
 Dense bodies

References

Organelles